Danish Strait is a strait running through the Sverdrup Islands in the Canadian Arctic Archipelago. Located in the waters of the Canadian territory of Nunavut, this natural waterway separates Thor Island to the north-west and Ellef Ringnes Island to the north and east from King Christian Island to the south.

Straits of Qikiqtaaluk Region